Kids' Voice Awards is an annual awards show, aired live on TV3 and held on June 1. The awards honour the year's biggest television, movie and music acts, as voted by children. It is usually held at the Utenos Entertainment Arena in Vilnius, Lithuania.

Person of the Year Award
The Person of the Year Award was presented to those whose accomplishments, fame and popularity set them above everyone else. Initially, the award was chosen by the kids from a slate of nominees. Actors, athletes, politicians, and singers were all eligible for the award, with ballots containing nominees from multiple categories.

Person of the Year Award winners
2005 - 
2006 - Valdas Adamkus
2007 - Nelly Uvarova
2008 - Mom

References 

Awards established in 2005
Children's television awards
2005 establishments in Lithuania
Lithuanian television series
Lithuanian awards
2000s Lithuanian television series
2010s Lithuanian television series
2005 Lithuanian television series debuts